Armen Petrosyan (born September 26, 1975), also known by his nickname Mench, is an Armenian actor, producer and broadcaster. He is known for his role as Sergey on Full House. He was a broadcaster of Bluff, 7.5, Evening Cocktail, and Super Duet in 2007-2014. He was also a producer of Full House.

Biography
Armen Petrosyan was born on September 26, 1975 in Yerevan. In 1998, he graduated from the Armenian State University of Economics.

Career
2002-2005 — General producer of Hay TV
2003-2005 — Author and host of the program "Evening cocktail"
2003-2007 — "Bluff" co-author of the program and host 
2006 — Producer of "Super Duet" music project
2007-2009 — Founder and actor of the humorous play "7.5"
2009 — Participant of the international TV show Fort Boyard
2014-2015 — Host-producer of the comedy show "Let's Agree"
2015-2018 — Producer of New Year programs of Armenia TV
2016-2017 — Producer of entertainment programs of Armenia TV
2016-2019 — Director of Radio Jan
2018 — Host and producer of the TV program "Mench Challenge"
2020 — Producer of the sitcom "Hars chka"

Filmography

External links 
 
Official Website

References

1975 births
Living people
Male actors from Yerevan
Television people from Yerevan
Armenian male film actors
21st-century Armenian male actors
20th-century Armenian male actors
Armenian State University of Economics alumni
Armenian television producers